Tricerophora is a genus of moths in the family Gelechiidae erected by Anthonie Johannes Theodorus Janse in 1958.

Species
Tricerophora commaculata (Meyrick, 1921) Mozambique, South Africa, Zimbabwe
Tricerophora nigribasis (Janse, 1960) South Africa, Namibia
Tricerophora pundamilia Bidzilya & Mey, 2018 South Africa
Tricerophora rukinga Bidzilya & Mey, 2018 Kenya
Tricerophora objecta (Meyrick, 1921) Zimbabwe, Congo
Tricerophora brumale Bidzilya & Mey, 2018 Namibia
Tricerophora nigrinervis Bidzilya & Mey, 2018 South Africa, Namibia
Tricerophora acutivalva Bidzilya & Mey, 2018 southern Iran
Tricerophora minimorum Bidzilya & Mey, 2018 Namibia

References

Gelechiinae